Epifanio Ariel García Duarte (born 2 July 1992) is a Paraguayan professional footballer who plays as a forward for River Plate.

Career

Club
García started his senior footballing career in Paraguay with Cerro Porteño, with whom he made his professional debut with in June 2011 against Nacional in the Paraguayan Primera División. Two further appearances followed in 2012 and 2013 for García, before he played five times during 2014. He left in 2015 following eight appearances, none of which were starts. García signed for fellow Paraguayan top-flight club Guaraní in June 2015. Before featuring for Guaraní, García had a loan spell with Paraguayan División Intermedia side Fulgencio Yegros where he scored eight goals in thirty-six games.

He eventually made his Guaraní debut on 16 October 2016, over a year after joining, in a league match with River Plate, he scored his first career goal in the process during a 1–2 win. In total, he went onto score three goals, including one versus former club Cerro Porteño, in eight games throughout 2016. He scored three goals in seven 2017 Copa Libertadores matches for Guaraní. On 23 July 2017, García joined Argentine Primera División side Belgrano on loan.

International
García played four times for the Paraguay U17s in 2009.

Career statistics
.

Honours
Cerro Porteño
Paraguayan Primera División (2): 2012 Apertura, 2013 Clausura

Guaraní
Paraguayan Primera División: 2016 Clausura

References

External links

1992 births
Living people
People from Misiones Department
Paraguayan footballers
Paraguayan expatriate footballers
Paraguayan expatriate sportspeople in Argentina
Expatriate footballers in Argentina
Association football forwards
Paraguayan Primera División players
Argentine Primera División players
Cerro Porteño players
Club Guaraní players
Club Fulgencio Yegros players
Club Atlético Belgrano footballers
River Plate (Asunción) footballers